Emil Djuse (born October 27, 1993) is a Swedish professional ice hockey defenceman currently playing for SC Rapperswil-Jona Lakers in the National League (NL). He has formerly played in the Swedish Hockey League (SHL) with Frölunda HC, Modo Hockey and Skellefteå AIK.

Playing career
During the 2015–16 season Djuse appeared in a career high 46 games with Modo Hockey establishing new marks of 11 assists and 15 points. He was assigned to also play one game with Timrå IK of the HockeyAllsvenskan on loan from Modo. Upon relegation to the Allsvenskan for Modo, Djuse left the club to sign a two-year contract to remain in the SHL with Skellefteå AIK on May 19, 2016.

On April 29, 2019, Djuse signed a one-year, entry-level contract with the Dallas Stars of the National Hockey League (NHL). After attending the Stars' 2019 training camp, Djuse was assigned to begin the 2019–20 season, his first in North America, with AHL affiliate the Texas Stars. Earning a top-pairing role within Texas' blueline, Djuse registered 4 goals and 29 points through 48 games.

On 24 February 2020, at the NHL trade deadline, Djuse was traded by the Dallas Stars to the Florida Panthers in exchange for a sixth-round draft pick in 2020. He was immediately assigned to join the Panthers' AHL affiliate, the Springfield Thunderbirds. Djuse registered 3 points in 5 games with the Panthers' AHL affiliate, the Springfield Thunderbirds, before the season was cancelled due to COVID-19.

As an impending restricted free agent with the Panthers, Djuse opted to conclude his North American career by signing a one-year contract with Russian club, HC Spartak Moscow of the Kontinental Hockey League (KHL), on 18 June 2020. In his lone season with Spartak, Djuse compiled 6 goals and 28 points through 45 regular season games of the 2020–21 season.

Leaving Russia as a free agent, Djuse signed a two-year contract in Switzerland, agreeing to terms with SC Rapperswil-Jona Lakers of the NL, on 26 May 2021.

International play
Djuse represented the Swedish national junior team at the 2013 World Junior Ice Hockey Championships, winning a silver medal.

Career statistics

Regular season and playoffs

International

References

External links
 

1993 births
Living people
Frölunda HC players
Malmö Redhawks players
Modo Hockey players
Mora IK players
SC Rapperswil-Jona Lakers players
Södertälje SK players
Skellefteå AIK players
HC Spartak Moscow players
Springfield Thunderbirds players
Swedish ice hockey defencemen
Texas Stars players
Timrå IK players
People from Östersund
Sportspeople from Jämtland County